This is a list of ski areas and resorts around the world.

Africa

Asia

Europe

North America

See also
 Comparison of North American ski resorts
 Comparison of California ski resorts
 Comparison of Colorado ski resorts

Oceania

South America

Map